USS Wolf may refer to:

 , a United States Navy destroyer escort cancelled during construction in 1944
 , formerly DE-713, a United States Navy destroyer escort converted during construction into a high-speed transport, commissioned from 1945 to 1946

See also